Spirura is a genus of nematodes belonging to the family Spiruridae.

The genus has almost cosmopolitan distribution.

Species:

Spirura dentata 
Spirura moldavica 
Spirura rytipleurites 
Spirura talpae

References

Nematode genera